Fan(), also FANO or Fanno, is an Amhara militia. One stated objective of Fano leadership as of March 2020 was for Benishangul-Gumuz Region's Metekel Zone, the districts of Welkait and Raya in the Amhara gion, and the district of Dera in Amhara to be placed under the control of the Amhara Region. During the Tigray conflict, Fano supported federal and Amhara regional forces against rebels aligned to the Tigray People's Liberation Front (TPLF). Fano members protect Amhara people from looters(Tigray People's Liberation Front).

History 
Fano can be traced back to the resistance against the Italian occupation of Ethiopia. Fano and its Oromo equivalent, Qeerroo, rose to prominence in the 2010s as they mobilized against the repression under the TPLF-dominated government, which had dominated Ethiopian politics from 1991-2018 through a one-party system. The alliance between Amhara region officials and Qeerroo played a crucial role in bringing about the political and administrative changes associated with the premiership of Abiy Ahmed, during which the TPLF lost control of federal political power and the Prosperity Party emerged.

Perception 
Fano is perceived by different media and human rights groups as either a protest group or a militia. The Organization for World Peace described Fano in October 2020 as an "Amhara vigilante youth group" that saw itself as providing law and order that government was unable to provide. Fano has attained popularity among Amhara people for their mobilization against the TPLF invasion of Amhara Region as well as their efforts to advance Amhara interests and protect Amhara civilians in other regions. Amhara militias are often described by opposition groups with the term neftenya, which is generally seen as derogatory.

Structure and leadership 
As of 23 April 2020, the leader of Fano was Mesafint Tesfa, according to the news agency Borkena. Borkena has described Fano as a "loosely organized youth organization."

Post-2018 armed conflicts and accusations of massacres

2019

10–11 January 2019 
During the days leading to 10 January 2019, local militia and administrative officials supported by "an Amhara youth vigilante group" that Amnesty International started building trenches and preparing to attack Qemant people in Metemma. From 15:00 on 10 January 2019 to 13:00 on 11 January 58 Qemant people were killed in the massacre in Metemma using guns, grenades, stones and by burning houses. Amnesty stated that a unit of the Amhara police special force wore insignia. The Ethiopian National Defense Force (ENDF) in Metemma initially refused to intervene on the grounds that they didn't have orders to do so. The massacre terminated when the ENDF intervened on the afternoon of 11 January.

On 29 September 2019, Qeerroo killed and burnt four members of a family in Azezo in revenge for the killing of an Amhara youth. A cycle of vengeance attacks continued for several days. Qeerroo went "home to home attacking Qemant residents".

2020

March 2020 
On 19 March 2020, clashes including gunfire took place between youths and regional security forces, supported by federal security forces, in Gondar and Dabat in the Amhara Region. The youths were Fano according to Andafta Media. Prosperity Party authorities in Amhara said that the youths were not related to Fano but pursuing their own interests in the name of Fano.

On 28 March 2020, Fano Chairperson at the time, Solomon Atanaw, stated that the attacks were started by the regional and federal security forces, including the use of heavy artillery. Atanaw said that death threats against Fano members had been made by telephone to Fano survivors of the clashes. Gondar city officials stated that Fano had killed and kidnapped people, confiscated property, freed prisoners, and stolen weapons from police stations, and called on the group to disarm and surrender immediately. Atanaw said that Fano would not disarm until demands about the return of land were met. Atanaw said that Fano had contributed to peace by preventing an anti-government attack by Qemant extremists.

April 2020 
On 23 April 2020, local state media reported that Fano leader Mesafint Tesfu had reached an agreement with government authorities after the government worried that the residence might spread to the areas of the Amhara region.

November 2020 

Fano backed the ENDF and Amhara regional forces in the Tigray War, which began on 4 November 2020 when TPLF-aligned forces attacked the ENDF Northern Command headquarters in what TPLF spokesman Getachew Reda called a "preemptive operation".

 TPLF were implicated in the Mai Kadra massacre by Tigrayan refugees. Residents of Mai Kadra disagreed, according to investigations by Amnesty International, the Ethiopian Human Rights Commission (EHRC) and the Ethiopian Human Rights Council (EHRCO), instead attributing the massacre to Tigrayan youths mainly from the Samri kebele in Mai Kadra, supported by Tigray Special Forces and militia. According to the EHRC-OHCHR Tigray investigation, these Tigrayan groups killed hundreds of Amhara civilians in Mai Kadra on 9-10 November 2020, then in the subsequent days at least 5 Tigrayans in that town were killed by Fano members in retaliation.
	
 During the Tigray War in November 2020, a 54-year old refugee interviewed by The Guardian, Gush Tela from Humera, stated that he was beaten by federal security forces "until he was covered in blood and could not walk", and then transferred him to a Fano group, who freed him. Tela stated that the Fano were ordered to destroy Humera and "'finish' Tigrayans". Tela said that he witnessed a man "beheaded with machetes". Other refugees showed wounds that they attributed to knife and machete attacks by Fano.

2022

May 2022 
On 19 May 2022, clashes broke out between regional and federal government forces and Fano in the town of Mota when government forces attempted to disarm and arrest Fano members. Later that day, as locals gathered in protest against the arrests, federal and regional forces fired into the crowd, killing an unspecified number of individuals. On 23 May 2022, local state media reported that over 4,500 people were arrested in the Amhara Region. Amhara regional authorities aligned with the Prosperity Party said that they were not targeting Fano but individuals who had committed illegal acts in the name of Fano. Many residents of the region disagreed. In a statement released by the Ethiopian Human Rights Commission (EHRC) in response to the crackdown, EHRC director Daniel Bekele called on federal and regional security forces to ". . . refrain from arresting suspects before criminal investigations [are held], arresting journalists for their work, and detaining people without a court order."

See also 
 Tigray War
 Humera massacre
 Mai Kadra massacre
 Neftenya
Qeerroo

References 

Ethnic groups in Ethiopia
Political movements in Ethiopia
Tigray War
Youth movements